Spergularia atrosperma is a species of flowering plant in the family Caryophyllaceae known by the common name blackseed sandspurry. It is native to California and Nevada, where it grows in muddy and sandy habitat, often in moist alkaline substrates. It is a small annual herb producing a slender stem up to 15 centimeters long. It is lined with fleshy linear leaves. The inflorescence bears small flowers with five pointed sepals and five oval white or pink petals. The fruit is a capsule containing shiny, sometimes iridescent, black seeds.

References

External links
 Calflora Database: Spergularia atrosperma (Blackseed sandspurry,  Sand spurrey)
Jepson Manual eFlora (TJM2) treatment of Spergularia atrosperma
USDA Plants Profile for Spergularia atrosperma
Flora of North America
UC Photos gallery: Spergularia atrosperma

atrosperma
Flora of California
Flora of Nevada
Natural history of the Central Valley (California)
Natural history of the Peninsular Ranges
Flora without expected TNC conservation status